Janakiram is an Indian doctor and film actor, who has worked on Tamil language films.

Film career
Keen to work in Tamil cinema as a playback singer, Janaki Ram moved to Chennai to seek opportunities, and received a breakthrough as an actor. Janaki Ram worked on his first film Kattuviriyan in early 2007, starring as the love interest of Malavika's character. Janaki Ram later played the lead role in Brahmadeva (2009), where he appeared as a mentally-challenged person and a happy-go-lucky youngster. He also produced the film under his studio of Royal Pentagon's Productions and worked with the director to write the script. During the period, Janaki Ram also worked on Moondram Pournami, a horror film alongside Preethi Varma, where he also doubled up as a playback singer. Directed by Ravinder, a cinematographer known for his work on Chinnathambi (1992), the film eventually had a delayed release in February 2023.

In 2012, Janaki Ram individually prepared Kattuviriyan for release in Telugu under the title of Nippulanti Nijam. It was revealed that Telugu version was directed by Kumar Ponnada and produced by Arjun Reddy, with musical scores rendered by Sekhar and Chinni Krishna. Janaki Ram used an extra song featuring Mumaith Khan for the film, with an audio release function taking place in Hyderabad during May 2012.

Medical career
Janakiram is known for his work on endoscopic management of Juvenile Nasopharyngeal Angiofibroma (JNA) and for his work in skull base surgery. He is currently the managing mirector of Royal Pearl Hospital in Tiruchirapally, India.

Filmography

References

Living people
Film directors from Tamil Nadu
Year of birth missing (living people)
Male actors in Tamil cinema
Place of birth missing (living people)
21st-century Indian male actors